James Fraser or James Frazer may refer to:

Politics 
James Fraser (businessman) (c. 1760–1822), merchant, judge and politician in New Brunswick
James Fraser (Lower Canada politician) (c. 1785–1844), merchant and political figure in Lower Canada
James S. Frazer (1824–1893), Justice of the Indiana Supreme Court
James Oliphant Fraser (1826–1904), businessman and political figure in Newfoundland
James Harshaw Fraser (1841–1899), lawyer and political figure in Ontario
James A. Fraser (1843–1937), gold miner and Canadian politician
James Oliphant Fraser Jr. (1858–1896), lawyer and politician in Newfoundland
James Fraser (Western Australian politician) (1889–1961), trade unionist and politician
Jim Fraser (politician) (1908–1970), Australian politician, member of the Australian Parliament

Sports 
James Fraser (footballer) (fl. 1880s), Scottish footballer
Jim Fraser (Australian footballer) (1896–1975), Australian rules footballer 
Jim Fraser (American football) (1936–2020), American football linebacker
Jimmy Fraser (born 1948), Australian football goalkeeper
Jim Fraser (Scottish footballer) (fl. 1960s)
James Fraser (rugby union) (1859–1943), Scotland international rugby union player

Others 
James Fraser of Brea (1639–1699), Scottish Covenanter
James Fraser of Castle Leathers (1670–1760), Scottish soldier
James Fraser (minister) (1700–1769), Scottish minister
James Baillie Fraser (1783–1856), Scottish author 
James Stuart Fraser (1783–1869), British army officer in the Madras army in India
James John Fraser (1789–1834), 3rd Baronet of Leadclune, lieutenant-colonel in the British Army 
James Fraser (publisher) (died 1841), Scottish publisher associated with Thomas Carlyle
James Fraser (bishop) (1818–1885), British religious leader
James Earle Fraser (sculptor) (1876–1953), American sculptor
Sir James Fraser (1863–1936), British psychologist and creator of the Fraser spiral illusion
James O. Fraser (1886–1938), Missionary to China, creator of the Lisu alphabet
James Fraser (surgeon) (1924–1997), Scottish academic surgeon 
James Fraser (university administrator) (born 1948), principal of the University of the Highlands and Islands, Scotland
James E. Fraser (historian) (fl. 2000s), Canadian historian
Sir James George Frazer (1854–1941), Scottish social anthropologist and folklorist
James Fraser (police officer) (1816–1892), British army officer and police officer

Fictional 
Jamie Fraser (character), a character in the Outlander series of novels by Diana Gabaldon
James Fraser (Home and Away), a character on the Australian soap opera Home and Away
Private James Frazer, a character in the TV series Dad's Army

See also
James Fraser Stoddart (born 1942), British chemist
James Frazier (disambiguation)